"What's My Name" is a song performed by China Anne McClain, Thomas Doherty, and Dylan Playfair that was released as a single on June 2, 2017, by Walt Disney Records. The song is featured in the musical fantasy television film Descendants 2.

Live performances
On July 17, Dove Cameron, Sofia Carson, China Anne McClain, Cameron Boyce, Booboo Stewart and Dianne Doan performed a mashup of "Ways to Be Wicked" and "What's My Name", both original songs from the movie musical on Good Morning America.

Music video
The video was directed by Kenny Ortega and released on June 14, 2017.

Charts

Certifications

Release history

References

2017 singles
2017 songs
Walt Disney Records singles
Songs written by Antonina Armato
Songs written by Tim James (musician)
Songs written by Tom Sturges
Song recordings produced by Rock Mafia
Songs from Descendants (franchise)
Songs written by IN-Q